Ballone Castle was built in the 16th century. It was unoccupied for a couple of centuries and fell into ruin. In the 1990s it was purchased and restored by an architect. The original castle was built on a Z-plan and is unusual in having one round tower and one rectangular tower.

Situated north of Rockfield on the east coast of the parish of Tarbat, Ballone castle, which was also known as Tarbat castle, was reputedly built by the Earls of Ross, but came into possession of the family of Viscount Tarbat and the Earl of Cromartie. John Mackenzie, who was created baronet of Tarbat in the County of Ross in 1628, died there in 1654.

The building is a Z-plan castle with a square tower on the south west and a circular drum-tower on the north east.
After the Tarbat family moved to Tarbat House further south in the parish of Kilmuir Easter, the castle became a ruin, but it has recently been restored as a private house.

References 

Ross and Cromarty